Platacmaea is a genus of moths in the family Lyonetiidae.

Species
Platacmaea cretiseca Meyrick, 1920

External links
Butterflies and Moths of the World Generic Names and their Type-species

Lyonetiidae